Morave may refer to:
 Moravë, Berat County, Albania
 Morave, Mawal, Pune district, Maharashtra, India